Duiker is a Dutch and Afrikaans surname which in both languages means "diver".
Notable people with this name include:

Itumeleng Duiker (born 1972), Botswana former footballer
Jan Duiker (1890–1935), Dutch architect
K. Sello Duiker (1974–2005), South African novelist
Simon Duiker (1874–1941), Dutch painter
William J. Duiker (born 1932), former United States Foreign Service officer

References

Occupational surnames
Dutch-language surnames
Afrikaans-language surnames